Jarrad McVeigh (born 7 April 1985) is a former Australian rules footballer who played for the Sydney Swans in the Australian Football League (AFL). He is the younger brother of former Essendon midfielder Mark McVeigh. He was co-captain of the Sydney Swans alongside Adam Goodes in 2011 and 2012 and Kieren Jack from 2013 to 2016.

Early life
McVeigh was born and raised on the Central Coast in New South Wales. He played his junior football with Pennant Hills AFC and the NSW/ACT Rams. In 2001 he was the joint winner of the McLean Medal for best player at the National AFL Under 16 Championships.  He performed well at the AFL Draft camp, recording the highest score in the beep test and the fastest three-kilometre run time. He was recruited by the Sydney Swans with fifth selection in the 2002 AFL Draft.

AFL career

Sydney (2004–2019)
McVeigh made his AFL debut, wearing guernsey number 3, in the Swans' embarrassing loss to triple-defending premiers, the Brisbane Lions, at the Gabba in Round 1 of the 2004 season.

Earning the Swans Most Improved Award from the 2007 season, McVeigh established himself from a tagger to a goal-kicking midfielder. In round 18, 2008 against the Western Bulldogs, he kicked a career-high 6 goals.

At the end of the 2008 season, McVeigh won his first Bob Skilton Medal, as the Swans Best and Fairest, posting 578 votes, 10 points in front of runner-up Brett Kirk, polling the maximum 50 votes in the round-18 clash against the Western Bulldogs. In 2009, McVeigh had a less successful year, missing some games due to a hamstring injury, and finishing sixth in the Best and Fairest award.

In 2010, McVeigh finished fourth in the Bob Skilton Medal. He was selected on the International Rules squad for the tour to Ireland in October.

In 2011, McVeigh was appointed co-captain of the Sydney Swans alongside Adam Goodes. The death of his newborn daughter, Luella, marred his season. In his absence, the Swans defeated eventual premiers  at Skilled Stadium (the first time a visiting side had won at that location in four years) in round 23 and dedicated the win to the McVeigh family and Luella. Despite such a tragedy, he managed to finish 10th in the 2011 Skilton Medal. In 2012, McVeigh captained the Sydney Swans to the 2012 premiership. His strong year was rewarded with a fifth-place finish in the 2012 Bob Skilton Medal.  In 2015, McVeigh became only the seventh person to reach 250 games for the Swans in round 7.

On 1 August 2019, McVeigh announced that he would retire at the conclusion of the 2019 AFL season.

Personal life
McVeigh is married to Clementine McVeigh. On 25 July 2011 they had their first child, Luella, who died barely a month later following serious heart complications.

In the first match since this tragedy, on 27 August 2011 the Swans caused one of the biggest upsets of the season knocking off  on its home ground, where it had not lost in 1462 days. For Sydney, it was their first win at the venue for more than 12 years. Sydney and Geelong players wore black armbands in the match 'as a mark of respect for their absent co-captain Jarrad McVeigh and his wife Clementine'. The remarkable victory by the Swans was considered a tribute to McVeigh and his daughter.

Essendon's players also wore black armbands in their match in respect to Mark's niece.

It was confirmed in February 2012 that Jarrad and his wife Clementine were expecting another baby. The McVeighs' second child Lolita-Luella McVeigh was born on 8 July 2012. They had another daughter on 12 September 2017, Florence McVeigh.

Statistics

|- style="background-color: #EAEAEA"
! scope="row" style="text-align:center" | 2004
|style="text-align:center;"|
| 3 || 20 || 6 || 7 || 85 || 60 || 145 || 32 || 26 || 0.3 || 0.4 || 4.3 || 3.0 || 7.3 || 1.6 || 1.3
|- 
! scope="row" style="text-align:center" | 2005
|style="text-align:center;"|
| 3 || 13 || 4 || 6 || 66 || 54 || 120 || 34 || 28 || 0.3 || 0.5 || 5.1 || 4.2 || 9.2 || 2.6 || 2.2
|- style="background:#eaeaea;"
! scope="row" style="text-align:center" | 2006
|style="text-align:center;"|
| 3 || 25 || 21 || 7 || 173 || 79 || 252 || 82 || 71 || 0.8 || 0.3 || 6.9 || 3.2 || 10.1 || 3.3 || 2.8
|- 
! scope="row" style="text-align:center" | 2007
|style="text-align:center;"|
| 3 || 23 || 11 || 15 || 212 || 106 || 318 || 105 || 52 || 0.5 || 0.7 || 9.2 || 4.6 || 13.8 || 4.6 || 2.3
|- style="background:#eaeaea;"
! scope="row" style="text-align:center" | 2008
|style="text-align:center;"|
| 3 || 24 || 32 || 14 || 251 || 216 || 467 || 114 || 75 || 1.3 || 0.6 || 10.5 || 9.0 || 19.5 || 4.8 || 3.1
|- 
! scope="row" style="text-align:center" | 2009
|style="text-align:center;"|
| 3 || 18 || 14 || 10 || 189 || 190 || 379 || 69 || 56 || 0.8 || 0.6 || 10.5 || 10.6 || 21.1 || 3.8 || 3.1
|- style="background:#eaeaea;"
! scope="row" style="text-align:center" | 2010
|style="text-align:center;"|
| 3 || 24 || 16 || 11 || 277 || 240 || 517 || 91 || 85 || 0.7 || 0.5 || 11.5 || 10.0 || 21.5 || 3.8 || 3.5
|- 
! scope="row" style="text-align:center" | 2011
|style="text-align:center;"|
| 3 || 22 || 19 || 11 || 297 || 173 || 470 || 81 || 97 || 0.9 || 0.5 || 13.5 || 7.9 || 21.4 || 3.7 || 4.4
|- style="background:#eaeaea;"
! scope="row" style="text-align:center" | 2012
|style="text-align:center;"|
| 3 || 25 || 18 || 13 || 352 || 264 || 616 || 108 || 80 || 0.7 || 0.5 || 14.1 || 10.6 || 24.6 || 4.3 || 3.2
|- 
! scope="row" style="text-align:center" | 2013
|style="text-align:center;"|
| 3 || 25 || 16 || 7 || 404 || 284 || 688 || 102 || 88 || 0.6 || 0.3 || 16.2 || 11.4 || 27.5 || 4.1 || 3.5
|- style="background:#eaeaea;"
! scope="row" style="text-align:center" | 2014
|style="text-align:center;"|
| 3 || 25 || 15 || 9 || 327 || 255 || 582 || 105 || 110 || 0.6 || 0.4 || 13.1 || 10.2 || 23.3 || 4.2 || 4.4
|- 
! scope="row" style="text-align:center" | 2015
|style="text-align:center;"|
| 3 || 22 || 12 || 5 || 290 || 243 || 533 || 121 || 99 || 0.5 || 0.2 || 13.2 || 11.0 || 24.2 || 5.5 || 4.5
|- style="background:#eaeaea;"
! scope="row" style="text-align:center" | 2016
|style="text-align:center;"|
| 3 || 21 || 8 || 6 || 249 || 178 || 427 || 70 || 78 || 0.4 || 0.3 || 11.9 || 8.5 || 20.3 || 3.3 || 3.7
|- 
! scope="row" style="text-align:center" | 2017
|style="text-align:center;"|
| 3 || 13 || 7 || 6 || 147 || 94 || 241 || 64 || 29 || 0.5 || 0.5 || 11.3 || 7.2 || 18.5 || 4.9 || 2.2
|- style="background:#eaeaea;"
! scope="row" style="text-align:center" | 2018
|style="text-align:center;"|
| 3 || 19 || 1 || 0 || 235 || 166 || 401 || 92 || 42 || 0.1 || 0.0 || 12.4 || 8.7 || 21.1 || 4.8 || 2.2
|- 
! scope="row" style="text-align:center" | 2019
|style="text-align:center;"|
| 3 || 6 || 1 || 0 || 57 || 51 || 108 || 24 || 7 || 0.2 || 0.0 || 9.5 || 8.5 || 18.0 || 4.0 || 1.2
|- class="sortbottom"
! colspan=3| Career
! 325
! 201
! 127
! 3611
! 2653
! 6264
! 1294
! 1023
! 0.6
! 0.4
! 11.1
! 8.2
! 19.3
! 4.0
! 3.1
|}

References

External links 

1985 births
Living people
Australian rules footballers from New South Wales
Sydney Swans players
Sydney Swans Premiership players
Bob Skilton Medal winners
NSW/ACT Rams players
All-Australians (AFL)
Pennant Hills Australian Football Club players
Australia international rules football team players
One-time VFL/AFL Premiership players
People educated at St Peter's Catholic College, Tuggerah